Gary Jennings (September 20, 1928 – February 13, 1999) was an American author who wrote children's and adult novels. In 1980, after the successful novel Aztec, he specialized in writing adult historical fiction novels.

Biography
Born September 20, 1928, in Buena Vista, Virginia, to Glen Edward and Vaughnye May Jennings, Gary Jennings attended little formal school after graduating from Eastside High School (of Lean on Me fame) in Paterson, New Jersey, and was mostly self-educated thereafter.

His novels were known for their historical detail and occasionally graphic content. Jennings' novels are well-researched: he lived for 12 years in Mexico to research the Aztec novels, traveled the Balkans while researching Raptor, and joined nine circus troupes during the writing of Spangle. He also produced a number of novels for younger readers, such as A Rope in the Jungle and a history of the occult Black Magic, White Magic.

Gary Jennings died in February 1999 in Pompton Lakes, New Jersey, aged 70, from heart failure.

Bibliography

Aztec series
 Aztec (1980) : A story of the Aztec empire just before and during the arrival of the Spaniards.
 Aztec Autumn (1997), a story of the Aztecs following the Spanish conquest.

Additional books in the series (Aztec Blood, 2002; Aztec Rage, 2006; Aztec Fire, 2008; Aztec Revenge, 2012) were written by Robert Gleason, Jennings's former editor, and Junius Podrug.

Novels
 The Terrible Teague Bunch (1975) : about a gang of Texas outlaws at the tail end of the Old West
 Sow the Seeds of Hemp (1976) : about a fire-breathing preacher in Mississippi
 The Journeyer (1984) : An account of the travels of Marco Polo to the Far East.
 Spangle (1987) : A chronicle of the lives of circus entertainers.  Also released in paperback, split into a trilogy: The Road Show, The Center Ring and The Grand Promenade.
 The Lively Lives of Crispin Mobey (by 'Gabriel Quyth') (1988) : "A novel of the hilarious chronicle of the exploits of an all-too-zealous missionary."  Mostly assembled from a series of short stories published under Jennings's real name in The Magazine of Fantasy and Science Fiction 1972–1979.
 Raptor (1992) : Thorn, a hermaphrodite, and his/her adventures in a post-Roman world.

For young adults
 March of the Robots: From The Manikins Of Antiquity To The Space Robots Of Tomorrow (1962)
 The Movie Book (1963)
 Parades!: Celebrations and circuses on the march (1966)
 The Teenager's Realistic Guide to Astrology (1971)
 The Shrinking Outdoors (1972)
 The Killer Storms: Hurricanes, Typhoons, and Tornadoes (1974)
 Black Magic, White Magic (1975)
 March of the Heroes: The folk hero through the ages (1975)
 March of the Gods (1976)
 The Rope in the Jungle (a novel) (1976)
 March of the Demons (1977)

For preschool readers
 The Earth Book (1975)

Nonfiction
 Personalities of Language (1965)
 World of Words: The Personalities of Language (1967)
 The Treasure of the Superstition Mountains (1973)

References

External links
 Unofficial website

1928 births
1999 deaths
American historical novelists
Eastside High School (Paterson, New Jersey) alumni
20th-century American novelists
People from Buena Vista, Virginia
Writers from Paterson, New Jersey
People from Pompton Lakes, New Jersey
Novelists from Virginia
Bancarella Prize winners
American male novelists
20th-century American male writers
Novelists from New Jersey